Lieutenant George Alexander Lingham   (30 November 1898 – 22 July 1982) was a World War I flying ace credited with six confirmed aerial victories.

Service in First World War

Lingham joined the Royal Flying Corps in 1916. He joined No. 43 Squadron RFC in late 1917. He scored his six victories between 9 March and 10 June 1918. His final tally was two enemy fighters destroyed, and four enemy planes driven down out of control. He was awarded the Distinguished Flying Cross.

Later life
Lingham worked in civil aviation after the war. He was a director of the Heston Aircraft Company during the 1930s. He died in a nursing home in Putney, England on 22 July 1982.

Notes

References

1898 births
1982 deaths
Australian World War I flying aces
Recipients of the Distinguished Flying Cross (United Kingdom)